Richard James Stevens (born 1955) is a British-born Falkland Islands teacher and politician who served as a Member of the Legislative Assembly for the Camp constituency from 2005 until 2009. Stevens was elected as a Member of the Legislative Council, which was reconstitution into the Legislative Assembly with the implementation of the 2009 Constitution.

Stevens was born in Devon and grew up in Kent before moving to the Falkland Islands in 1977 to work as a teacher. In 1984 he married Toni with whom he bought a farm in San Carlos.

He was first elected to the Legislative Council in 1993, but lost his seat four years later. Stevens returned to the Legislative Council at the 2005 general election, but again lost his seat in the 2009 general election.

References

1955 births
Living people
Falkland Islands Councillors 1993–1997
Falkland Islands Councillors 2005–2009
Falkland Islands schoolteachers
English emigrants to the Falkland Islands